Gong Zheng (born 20 April 1993) is a Chinese football player who currently plays for Quanzhou Yassin in the China League Two.

Club career
In 2013 Gong Zheng started his professional footballer career with Beijing Guoan in the Chinese Super League. He would eventually make his league debut for Beijing on August 25, 2013 in a game against Dalian Aerbin that saw Beijing win 4-0, coming on as a substitute for Zhang Xizhe in the 85th minute.

In February 2016, Gong transferred to China League One side Beijing BG. In 2017, Gong was loaned to League Two side Beijing BIT until 31 December 2018.
On 2 March 2019, Gong was loaned to Suzhou Dongwu for the 2019 season.

Career statistics
Statistics accurate as of match played 31 December 2020.

References

External links

1993 births
Chinese footballers
Footballers from Jilin
Chinese Super League players
China League One players
China League Two players
Beijing Guoan F.C. players
Beijing Sport University F.C. players
Suzhou Dongwu F.C. players
Living people
Association football forwards